Eva Birgitta Swartz Grimaldi, (born 15 April 1956) is a Swedish CEO within the field of culture and media. On 28 June 2007, she was appointed as chairman for investigation into the future of the Swedish culture politics by the Swedish culture minister Lena Adelsohn Liljeroth. Swartz became the CEO of the book publishers Natur & Kultur on 15 April 2005. Before that she was programme director at TV4 and had a number of CEO roles within the television industry. Among other things she was the CEO of the production company Meter Film & Television.

Swartz was the vice CEO of the board of Svenska Filminstitutet (Swedish Film Institute), a position she held until 31 December 2010. She was also a member of the Nobelstiftelsens media company Nobel Media. She has been the responsible for the information for Italienska kulturinstituet for Italy and work as an interpreter and translator. Since 1 January 2013, she has been the chairman for Norstedt Förlagsgrupp. In 2014, she became the new chairman of the Stadsbrudskåren, a non profit organisation that was founded in 1965. She always pushes for culture and media within her work as CEO and chairman.

She is married to the Italian industrialist Salvatore Grimaldi, and the couple live in Villa Geber.

References

Swedish businesspeople
Living people
1956 births